The 1954 Cincinnati Redlegs season was a season in American baseball. The team finished fifth in the National League with a record of 74–80, 23 games behind the New York Giants.

Offseason 
 October 6, 1953: Art Fowler was acquired by the Redlegs from the Milwaukee Braves as part of a conditional deal.
 December 1, 1953: Brooks Lawrence was drafted from the Redlegs by the St. Louis Cardinals in the 1953 minor league draft.

Regular season 
 April 17, 1954: In the seventh inning of the Redlegs' third game of 1954, against the Milwaukee Braves at County Stadium, Nino Escalera became the first black player in the history of the Cincinnati franchise. Escalera, an Afro-Latin American from Puerto Rico, pinch hits for Andy Seminick and singles off Lew Burdette. The next batter for the Redlegs is another pinch hitter, Chuck Harmon, who bats for Corky Valentine; Harmon becomes the team's first-ever African-American player.

Season standings

Record vs. opponents

Notable transactions 
 July 1954: Ernie Broglio was acquired by the Redlegs from the Oakland Oaks.
 August 7, 1954: Jim Pearce was purchased by the Redlegs from the Washington Senators.

Roster

Player stats

Batting

Starters by position 
Note: Pos = Position; G = Games played; AB = At bats; H = Hits; Avg. = Batting average; HR = Home runs; RBI = Runs batted in

Other batters 
Note: G = Games played; AB = At bats; H = Hits; Avg. = Batting average; HR = Home runs; RBI = Runs batted in

Pitching

Starting pitchers 
Note: G = Games pitched; IP = Innings pitched; W = Wins; L = Losses; ERA = Earned run average; SO = Strikeouts

Other pitchers 
Note: G = Games pitched; IP = Innings pitched; W = Wins; L = Losses; ERA = Earned run average; SO = Strikeouts

Relief pitchers 
Note: G = Games pitched; W = Wins; L = Losses; SV = Saves; ERA = Earned run average; SO = Strikeouts

Farm system 

Maryville-Alcoa franchise transferred to Morristown, June 19, 1954; Morristown club folded, July 7

References

External links
1954 Cincinnati Redlegs season at Baseball Reference

Cincinnati Reds seasons
Cincinnati Redlegs season
Cincinnati Reds